The CBS News iCast was a daily news audio podcast, created and first hosted by CBS News' New York-based Correspondent and Anchor Chris Mavridis. According to the CBS Corporation, the iCast was the world's first daily network news podcast. It was available at CBSnews.com and aggregated to hundreds of other websites.

Description 

The CBS News iCast launched on July 26, 2006. It was created and developed by CBS News correspondent and anchor Chris Mavridis and was intended as a daily downloadable network newscast for 18- to 34-year-olds. New York Times Arts reporter Steven McElroy wrote that the iCast "is the first network newscast developed specifically as a podcast". Access.com described the iCast as a "non-traditional, actuality-heavy five-minute newscast." The runtime was fluid, ranging from 5–7 minutes in length. Under the direction of Mavridis, a correspondent with CBS News since 2002, the iCast was initially presented in a "theatre-of-the-mind" radio format, employing dramatic elements mixed with natural-sound audio, news interviews and current music. Mavridis developed the style that mimicked talking to pre-recorded interviews and newsmakers.

Billboard magazine's Radio and Records described Mavridis's original iCast format as transforming "the traditional role of a reporter into more of an audio guide with an edge who leads the listener through a news story's chain of interrelated actualities."

Each show opened with the big story of the day, usually in a mock-conversation format, inserting pre-taped interviews and field reports to create the illusion of a conversation. The second segment is usually another major story of the day told in a slightly more sobering method. It is followed by "The World", which details three typically odd international news pieces, followed by the closing item, which was often an odd "kicker" story which usually involved heavy music production.

Distribution 

According to the July 26, 2006 edition of Billboard magazine, the podcast was "made available to more than 500 CBS Radio News affiliates, as well as via the CBS Radio network and the group's own website. One day after its debut on July 26, 2008, CBS News Vice President of Radio Harvey Nagler told the New York Times that he believed Mavridis's iCast would "most definitely change the way (people) think of CBS Radio News."

Impact on journalism 

Beginning in the fall of 2006, several top journalism schools across the United States and Canada adopted the "iCast" as part of their respective curricula. Columbia School of Journalism taught an "iCast" class. Professors at the University of North Carolina-Chapel Hill and Jacksonville University used several editions of the "iCast" to teach classes in "the Future of Media" and "the Future of News Writing." Toronto's Ryerson University school of Journalism, Humber College School of Journalism and Seneca College Broadcasting School also use the "iCast" as a teaching tool. According to a 2007 radio interview on Montreal station CJAD, Mavridis regularly tours some of these schools "lecturing on new media, grading writing projects and later imploring broadcast journalism students to drop out and enroll in dental college."

End of the iCast 

After Mavridis's departure from CBS News in September 2006, the iCast was hosted by various correspondents from CBS News Radio. Anchor Jim Chenevey hosted the show for several weeks, infusing music and humor into the show. Correspondent Dave Barett hosted occasionally and continued the tradition of innovative story telling through strong writing, music and use of sound. Eventually, CBS anchor and WCBS News reporter Jim Taylor assumed full-time iCast duties. The show, while still creative, began to veer towards a more traditional-sounding newscast. By the spring of 2007, the iCast was cancelled and replaced by a recording of CBS Radio's World News Roundup, anchored by Nick Young.

References 

Audio podcasts
CBS Radio
2006 podcast debuts